This is a list of listed buildings in Vejen Municipality, Denmark.

The list

6600 Vejen

6630 Rødding

6650 Brørup

6670 Holsted

References

External links

 Danish Agency of Culture

 
Vejen